Æthelwald  or Æthelwold (died 963) was ealdorman of East Anglia. He is mentioned in Byrhtferth's life of Oswald of Worcester along with other members of his family.

He was probably the oldest son of Æthelstan Half-King and succeeded to some of his father's offices in 956 when Æthelstan became a monk at Glastonbury Abbey. He was a benefactor of Ramsey Abbey and a supporter of the Benedictine reform movement which began in the reign of King Edgar.

He was the first husband of Ælfthryth who married King Edgar after Æthelwald's death. William of Malmesbury's Gesta regum anglorum has a late account of Æthelwald's marriage and death. According to William, the beauty of Ordgar's daughter Ælfthryth was reported to King Edgar. Edgar, looking for a Queen, sent Æthelwald to see Ælfthryth, ordering him "to offer her marriage [to Edgar] if her beauty were really equal to report." When she turned out to be just as beautiful as was said, Æthelwald married her himself and reported back to Edgar that she was quite unsuitable. Edgar was eventually told of this deception, and decided to repay Æthelwald's betrayal in like manner. He said that he would visit the poor woman, which alarmed Æthelwald. He asked Ælfthryth to make herself as unattractive as possible for the king's visit, but she did the opposite. Edgar, quite besotted with her, killed Æthelwald during a hunt.

Edward Augustus Freeman debunks the Æthelwald murder story as a "tissue of romance" in his Historic essays, but his arguments were in turn refuted by the naturalist William Henry Hudson in his 1920 book Dead Man's Plack and an Old Thorn.

Æthelwald was seemingly dead by 962 as he ceases to witness charters at that time. He was buried at Ramsey Abbey. His younger brother Æthelwine succeeded to his offices.

A memorial to Æthelwald, known as the Dead Man's Plack, was erected in Longparish, Hampshire in 1825.

Sources
 
  
 Henson, Donald, A Guide to Late Anglo-Saxon England: From Ælfred to Eadgar II. Hockwold-cum-Wilton: Anglo-Saxon Books, 1998. 
 Higham, Nick, The Death of Anglo-Saxon England. Stroud: Sutton, 1997. 
 Miller, Sean, "Æthelstan Half-King" in Michael Lapidge, et al. (eds), The Blackwell Encyclopedia of Anglo-Saxon England. Oxford: Blackwell, 1999. 
 Stafford, Pauline, Unification and Conquest: A Political and Social History of England in the Tenth and Eleventh Centuries. London: Edward Arnold, 1989. 
 William of Malmesbury, The Kings before the Norman Conquest, trans. Joseph Stevenson. Reprinted Llanerch, 1989.

References

10th-century births
962 deaths
Earls and ealdormen of East Anglia